Dustin Tynes (born 7 March 1996) is a Bahamian swimmer. He competed in the men's 100 metre breaststroke event at the 2016 Summer Olympics, where he ranked 44th with a time of 1:03.71. He did not advance to the semifinals

References

External links
 

1996 births
Living people
Bahamian male swimmers
Olympic swimmers of the Bahamas
Swimmers at the 2016 Summer Olympics
Place of birth missing (living people)
Swimmers at the 2014 Summer Youth Olympics
Swimmers at the 2015 Pan American Games
Pan American Games competitors for the Bahamas
Swimmers at the 2014 Commonwealth Games
Commonwealth Games competitors for the Bahamas
Male breaststroke swimmers